is a Japanese ice dancing coach and former competitor. With Kenji Miyamoto, she won two Japanese national titles and competed at seven ISU Championships.

Career 
Arikawa began learning to skate in 1984.

Partnership with Miyamoto 
She teamed up with Kenji Miyamoto no later than 1995. After winning the Japanese junior title, they were sent to the 1996 World Junior Championships in Brisbane, Australia, where they finished 22nd. The following season, they placed second at the Japan Junior Championships. They regained their national junior title before placing 16th at the 1998 World Junior Championships in Saint John, New Brunswick, Canada.

Advancing to the senior ranks, Arikawa/Miyamoto competed at their first Grand Prix events and became the national silver medalists in the 1998–1999 season. They took silver at the Asian Winter Games in South Korea and placed 9th at the 1999 Four Continents Championships in Canada.

In the 2001–2002 season, Arikawa/Miyamoto won their first senior national title and then placed 8th at the Four Continents Championships in Jeonju, South Korea. Making their only World Championships appearance, they qualified to the free dance and finished 24th overall in Nagano, Japan.

Arikawa/Miyamoto repeated as national champions the following season. In February 2003, they won the bronze medal at the Asian Winter Games in Aomori, Japan, and placed 8th at their final competition, the Four Continents Championships in Beijing, China. They were coached by Muriel Zazoui, Pasquale Camerlengo, Romain Haguenauer in Lyon, France.

Post-competitive career 
Arikawa has coached ice dancers Emi Hirai / Marien De La Asuncion and Misato Komatsubara / Timothy Koleto.

Programs 
 with Miyamoto

Results
GP: Grand Prix

with Miyamoto

References

External links
 
 Rie Arikawa / Kenji Miyamoto at Tracings.net

Japanese female ice dancers
Living people
1981 births
Asian Games medalists in figure skating
Figure skaters at the 1999 Asian Winter Games
Figure skaters at the 2003 Asian Winter Games
Medalists at the 1999 Asian Winter Games
Medalists at the 2003 Asian Winter Games
Asian Games silver medalists for Japan
Asian Games bronze medalists for Japan
Competitors at the 2001 Winter Universiade